Lavinia Tananta (born 3 November 1987) is an Indonesian former tennis player. She made her debut as a professional in May 2003, aged 15, at an ITF tournament in Jakarta.

In December 2008, Tananta won the women's singles in the inaugural Garuda Indonesia Tennis Masters, defeating Ayu-Fani Damayanti in the final.

She was part of Indonesia Fed Cup team from 2008 to 2016. The most recent WTA Tour tournament she played in was the 2011 Malaysian Open, partnering compatriot player Jessy Rompies.

Tananta has represented Indonesia at the 2009 and 2015 Southeast Asian Games, winning five medals, including the gold in the women's singles at the 2009 SEA Games at Vientiane.

ITF finals

Singles (6–5)

Doubles (14–17)

External links
 
 
 
 Jakarta Post article

Indonesian female tennis players
1987 births
Indonesian people of Chinese descent
Living people
Tennis players at the 2010 Asian Games
Tennis players at the 2006 Asian Games
People from Semarang
Southeast Asian Games gold medalists for Indonesia
Southeast Asian Games silver medalists for Indonesia
Southeast Asian Games bronze medalists for Indonesia
Southeast Asian Games medalists in tennis
Competitors at the 2009 Southeast Asian Games
Competitors at the 2011 Southeast Asian Games
Competitors at the 2015 Southeast Asian Games
Asian Games competitors for Indonesia